Šprinc is a small settlement in the Municipality of Razkrižje in eastern Slovenia, next to the border with Croatia. The area traditionally belonged to Zala County in the Kingdom of Hungary and is now included in the Mura Statistical Region.

There is a small chapel-shrine with a belfry in the settlement at the crossroads leading to Kopriva.  It was built in the late 19th century.

References

External links
Šprinc on Geopedia

Populated places in the Municipality of Razkrižje